The Stolen Face (German: Das gestohlene Gesicht) is a 1930 German crime film directed by Philipp Lothar Mayring and Erich Schmidt, and starring Hans Otto, Friedl Haerlin and Max Adalbert.

The film's sets were designed by the art director Werner Schlichting. It was shot on location in Berlin and Hamburg.

Cast

References

Bibliography
 Bock, Hans-Michael & Bergfelder, Tim. The Concise Cinegraph: Encyclopaedia of German Cinema. Berghahn Books, 2009.

External links

1930 films
1930 crime films
German crime films
Films of the Weimar Republic
1930s German-language films
Films directed by Philipp Lothar Mayring
UFA GmbH films
Films shot in Hamburg
German black-and-white films
1930s German films